Vilchesia valenciai is a species of beetle in the family Cerambycidae, the only species in the genus Vilchesia.

References

Hesperophanini